Kelsie Burrows (born 22 February 2001) is a Northern Irish association footballer who plays as a defender for Cliftonville. She has also played for English FA Women's Championship club Blackburn Rovers LFC and the Northern Ireland women's national team.

Club career
In September 2019 she left Northern Ireland to attend university in Preston, Lancashire, signing for nearby Blackburn Rovers of the FA Women's Championship. She returned to Linfield in February 2020. In June 2020 she modelled the club's new away kit.

International career
Burrows was called up to the senior Northern Ireland squad for the first time in October 2019 for UEFA Women's Euro 2021 qualifying Group C fixtures with Norway and Wales. She made her senior international debut in a 1–0 defeat by Iceland on 4 March 2020, at the 2020 Pinatar Cup.

References

External links

2001 births
Living people
Women's association football defenders
Women's association footballers from Northern Ireland
Northern Ireland women's international footballers
Women's Championship (England) players
Blackburn Rovers L.F.C. players
Linfield Ladies F.C. players
Women's Premiership (Northern Ireland) players
UEFA Women's Euro 2022 players